Brian E. Stanton (born February 19, 1961, in Los Angeles, California) is an American high jumper.  He represented his home country in the 1988 Olympics where he finished 11th in the final, jumping 2.31m.  He also jumped his personal record of 2.34m that same year.

In March 1996, then age 35, he jumped 2.20m at the Long Beach Relays, a mark which is superior to the listed American masters M35 record of 2.15m by Jim Barrineau.  Stanton's mark has never been ratified.  His mark was equaled by Doug Nordquist on the same track three months later, also never ratified, and Charles Austin improved upon that indoors seven years later, also never ratified.

References

1961 births
Living people
American male high jumpers
Athletes (track and field) at the 1988 Summer Olympics
Olympic track and field athletes of the United States
Track and field athletes from Los Angeles
20th-century American people